Sun Dome Fukui is a multi-purpose indoor arena in Echizen, Fukui, Japan. The capacity of the arena is 10,000 and was opened in 1995.

The hall hosted some for the 1995 World Artistic Gymnastics Championships.

External links
 Official site (Japanese)

Indoor arenas in Japan
Sports venues in Fukui Prefecture
Echizen, Fukui
Sports venues completed in 1995
1995 establishments in Japan